Fareb (English: Cheat) is a 2005 Indian romantic thriller film directed by Deepak Tijori. The film stars sisters Shilpa Shetty and Shamita Shetty and Manoj Bajpai. The music is composed by Anu Malik.

Plot 
Aditya works as a creative director in an advertising agency. His wife, Neha, a medical practitioner, is devoted to her husband and kid. Riya is married to Amit Singhania, a corporate honcho who happened to be a client of Aditya's ad-agency. Riya and Aditya meet at a presentation and she gets attracted to him. Riya is completely smitten by Aditya and tries to seduce him time and again. He spurns her advances initially but succumbs to her charms eventually. This leads to a rift between Aditya and Neha. And then the unthinkable happens: Riya is murdered. The needle of suspicion points towards Aditya and the cops arrest him. Someone is also watching Aditya and blackmailing him for his affair with Riya. In the end it's shown that Neha killed Riya in a fit of rage. She goes to confront Riya and ask her to leave her husband but Riya insults her and tells Neha to get out of her house. So Neha gets mad and hits Riya with a vase killing her. In the end, she gets away with Riya's murder and lives happily with her husband.

Cast
 Shilpa Shetty as Dr. Neha Malhotra
 Manoj Bajpayee as Aditya 'Adi' Malhotra
 Shamita Shetty as Ria Singhania
 Parmeet Sethi as Siddharth Sardesai
 Milind Gunaji as Advocate Milind Mehta
 Kelly Dorji as Inspector Kelly Dorjee
 Shawar Ali as Plainclothes Police officer
 Gagan Gupta		
 Sonia Kapoor as Sonia Sharma
 Firdosh Mewawala		
 Hemant Pandey	as Police Crew
 Anup Shukla
 Shaikh Sami		
 Bakul Thakker	as Amit Singhania, Ria's husband 	
 Homi Wadia as Public Prosecutor Saxena

Music
All music composed by Anu Malik and lyrics by Sayeed Quadri.

"Baras Jaa Aye Badal" (Shower O'clouds) -Sunidhi Chauhan - Lyrics by Sayeed Quadri
"Pehle Se Ab Woh Din" (The days are not like before) - Shreya Ghoshal, Kunal Ganjawala
"Pehle se ab Woh Din (remix)" - Shreya Ghoshal, Kunal Ganjawala
"Jau Kaha Tere Bina" - (Where should I go without you) Udit Narayan, Shraddha Pandit, Zubeen Garg
"Shaam Aayegi" (The evening will come) - Sonu Nigam
"Subah Bhi Beqaraar Hain". (The morning is restless) - Alisha Chinoy

Reception
Taran Adarsh of  IndiaFM gave the film 2 out of 5, writing ″Manoj Bajpai handles his role with amazing ease. He is superb in two sequences mainly, his angry outburst [with Shamita] and the courtroom sequence in the pre-climax. Shilpa Shetty maintains the studied silence part with grace and maturity. Shamita Shetty is getting better with every film. First ZEHER and now FAREB, she has evolved into a fine actor. Also, she exhibits her anatomy without any inhibitions. Kelly Dorji is expressionless. Milind Gunaji and Parmeet Sethi are okay. On the whole, FAREB is an average fare.  Patcy N of Rediff.com wrote ″Tijori got actors like Bajpai and beautiful women like Shilpa and Shamita, and yet, he could not produce good results. He cannot seem to make up his mind whether he wants a suspense thriller or a romantic film. The screenplay drags.″

References

External links
 

2005 films
2000s Hindi-language films
2005 thriller films
Films directed by Deepak Tijori
Films scored by Anu Malik
Indian thriller films
Hindi-language thriller films